Gbinti is a rural town in Dibia chiefdom , Port Loko District in the Northern Province of Sierra Leone.  The town is the chieftaincy seat of Dibia chiefdom. Gbinti lies about 20 miles from the district capital Port Loko and approximately 52 miles east of Freetown. 

The inhabitant of Gbinti are largely from the Temne ethnic group and many of the Temne people of Gbinti are partially of Fula descent, who had settled in the town as settlers over a hundred and fifty years ago. The Temne language is widely spoken in the town along with the Krio language.

The population of Gbinti is almost entirely Muslim.. Gbinti has a number of primary school and one secondary school called the Gbinti Secondary School. There is one police station in the town run by the Sierra Leone Police Port Loko District Division.

Family Root
Gbinti is the homeland of the Bundu Family, the Wurie Family, the Jah Family and the Dainkeh Family .

Notable people born or descendant from Gbinti
Abass Bundu, Sierra Leonean politician and diplomat
Amadu Wurie, early Sierra Leonean educationist and politician
Ibrahim Bundu, Sierra Leonean politician
Rashid Wurie, former Sierra Leonean international footballer

External links
http://www.chinci.com/travel/pax/q/2408995/Gbinti/SL/Sierra+Leone/0/#

References

Populated places in Sierra Leone
Northern Province, Sierra Leone